Nemanja Popović (born December 29, 2001) is a Serbian professional basketball player for Crvena zvezda mts of the ABA League.

Early career 
Popović started to play basketball for KK BB Basket in Mladenovac. In 2015, he joined Vizura in Belgrade. In summer 2017, Popović was added to the Crvena zvezda youth team. Popović won the second place at the 2017–18 Junior ABA League season with the Zvezda. Over six tournament games, he averaged 9.8 points, 6.1 rebounds and 0.5 assists per game. In August 2018, he participated at the Basketball Without Borders Europe camp in Belgrade, Serbia. In February 2019, Popović participated at the NBA All-Star Basketball Without Borders Global Camp in Charlotte, North Carolina. Popović won the second place at the 2018–19 Junior ABA League season with the Zvezda. Over seven season games, he averaged 14.0 points, 4.7 rebounds and 3.1 assists per game.

Professional career 
In January 2018, Popović was added to the Crvena zvezda ABA League roster for the rest of the 2017–18 season. He missed to play a single game during that season. In August 2018, he was loaned out to Žarkovo of the Second League of Serbia. In April 2019, he was added to FMP of the Basketball League of Serbia. On April 27, he made his Serbian League debut against Zlatibor, making 2 points and 3 rebounds in under 14 minutes of playing time. In January 2020, Popović signed a four-year contract with FMP. Following the 2020–21 season Popović declared for the 2021 NBA draft. On July 19, 2021, he withdrawn his name from consideration for the 2021 NBA draft. On 23 September 2021, Popović signed a three-year contract with Crvena zvezda. On the next day, he made his debut for Crvena zvezda in their season opening 97–61 win over Split, making 3 points, a rebound, and an assist in under 11 minutes of playing time. On 5 January 2022, Popović was loaned out to Vojvodina for the rest of the 2021–22 season. He returned to the Zvezda for the 2022 pre-season training camp.

National team career
Popović was a member of the Serbian under-16 national team that won the bronze medal at the 2017 FIBA Europe Under-16 Championship in Montenegro. Over seven tournament games, he averaged 5.9 points, 4.1 rebounds and 2.4 assists per game. Popović was a member of the Serbian under-17 team that participated at the 2018 FIBA Under-17 Basketball World Cup in Argentina. Over seven tournament games, he averaged 5.0 points, 3.3 rebounds and 2.0 assists per game.

References

External links 
 Profile at eurobasket.com
 Profile at euroleague.net
 Profile at realgm.com
 Profile at ABA League

2001 births
Living people
ABA League players
Basketball League of Serbia players
KK Crvena zvezda players
KK FMP players
KK Vojvodina players
KK Žarkovo players
OKK Beograd players
People from Aranđelovac
Power forwards (basketball)
Serbian men's basketball players